The Bommer Weiher are a series of fish ponds near Alterswilen in the municipality of Kemmental, Canton of Thurgau, Switzerland. Their surface area is about 0.15 km2.

External links 
 Die Bommer Weiher on Kemmental's official website

Bommer
Lakes of Thurgau